Walk in Love is the third studio album by Green Velvet. It was released on Relief Records in 2005.

Track listing

Personnel
Credits adapted from the CD edition's liner notes.

 Green Velvet – vocals, production

References

External links
 

2005 albums
Green Velvet albums